JS Uzushio (SS-592) is the third boat of the s. She was commissioned on 9 March 2000.

Construction and career
Uzushio was laid down at Kawasaki Heavy Industries Kobe Shipyard on 6 March 1996 and launched on 26 November 1998. She was commissioned on 9 March 2000 and deployed to Yokosuka.

The vessel participated in the major naval exercise RIMPAC 2004 from 19 August to 17 November 2004. The submarine participated in RIMPAC 2007 from 23 August to 29 November 2007.

On 17 January 2011, Uzushio left Yokosuka for training in the United States near Hawaii. Called at Guam on 20 April after the dispatch training was completed. She returned to Kure on the 28th.

Gallery

Citations

External links

1998 ships
Oyashio-class submarines
Ships built by Kawasaki Heavy Industries